Agaricophagus is a genus of beetle belonging to the family Leiodidae.

The genus was first described by Schmidt in 1841.

The species of this genus are found in Europe.

Species:
 Agaricophagus cephalotes Schmidt, 1841

References

Leiodidae